Drosera salina is an erect perennial tuberous species in the carnivorous plant genus Drosera. It is endemic to Western Australia and is only found in salt-free sand on the margins of salt lakes in a few locations north of Albany east to north-west of Esperance. The specific epithet, salina, refers to the salt lake margins that this species inhabits. White flowers bloom from July to September.

Drosera salina was first described by N. G. Marchant and Allen Lowrie in 1992. It is listed by Western Australia's Department of Environment and Conservation as a priority two poorly known taxon on the Declared Rare and Priority Flora List.

See also
List of Drosera species

References

Carnivorous plants of Australia
Caryophyllales of Australia
Eudicots of Western Australia
Plants described in 1992
salina